The silvery-throated jay (Cyanolyca argentigula) is a species of bird in the family Corvidae. It is found in the Talamancan montane forests of Costa Rica and western Panama. The IUCN has rated its conservation status as being of "least concern".

Description
The silvery-throated jay is a distinctive small jay, unlikely to be confused with any other bird found within its range. The head is black with a narrow but obvious white supercilium, and it bears an inconspicuous crest of short stiff feathers on the forehead. The throat and breast are silvery-white, sometimes with a violet sheen. The mantle, neck and sides of breast are black which gradually blends into the dark purplish-blue of the rest of the plumage. The upper surfaces of the wings and tail are a brighter, paler shade of blue and the undersides are blackish. The irises are deep red and the bill and legs are black. The plumage of the juvenile is duller and lacks the white on the head.

Ecology
A sociable bird, it moves through the upper parts of the forest canopy in groups of four to ten. Outside the breeding season, larger groups of up to thirty may form, and they tend to roost communally, settling down for the night with much chatter. When foraging, they move methodically through the crowns of trees, searching in crevices and probing into mosses, lichens and other epiphytes. They feed on insects and other invertebrates, amphibians, lizards, fruit and berries. The breeding season is in the period March to June, but little is known about the nest and eggs of this bird.

Status
It is a relatively uncommon species, and at around  its total area of occupancy is small, but the population seems stable and the International Union for Conservation of Nature has rated its conservation status as being of "least concern".

References

External links

silvery-throated jay
Birds of the Talamancan montane forests
silvery-throated jay
Taxonomy articles created by Polbot